Najib Mahmoud Al-Rayyes (1898–1952) was a Syrian political journalist, publisher, and intellectual.

Early life and education
Al-Rayyes was born in 1898 in the Syrian city of Hama and received his primary education in its private schools. Then he moved to the city of Homs with his father, who was appointed chief of the city’s police, where he continued his studies at the hands of senior professors of Arabic language and religion.

Career

Journalism
Al-Rayyes went to Damascus in 1919 and made it his headquarters and worked in the Syrian press. After that, he wrote to a number of Lebanese newspapers, including Al-Ahrar and Al-Nahar. Then he moved to issuing Al-Qabas newspaper in 1928. It was a bureau of the national movement and a record of the national renaissance in Syria and the Arab countries. The most famous and most popular Syrian newspaper enjoys the confidence of the Syrian people. Al-Qabas newspaper merged in 1953 with Azza Hosari's Damascene "Al-Alam newspaper" when President Adib Al-Shishakli issued a decision to merge all two newspapers in the country into one newspaper. Later, the heirs of "Al-Rayes" and Azza Hosariah suggested voluntarily merging the two newspapers by agreement, and the first issue was issued in 1954 under the name "Al-Qabas Al-Alam", but it soon returned to being published independently.

National Struggle
In addition to his excellence in journalistic work, Najib Al-Rayes was famous for his struggle in the national field. His editorials were whips of fire against the French colonizer. Therefore, “Al-Qabas” was disrupted time and time again until he ended up paying a heavy price for that in prison and exile by the French authorities. He also gained wide fame through his famous national anthem “Oh, the darkness of the prison” which he organized in exile on the island of Arwad, to which the French Mandate exiled him in 1922. In the period between 1920 and 1943, Najib Al Rayes was an inmate in prisons, detention centers and exiles in the castle Damascus, Mezzeh, Aleppo, Beirut, Rashaya, and others until the total of his life spent in prisons was about eight years.
The president was a free, noble, principled person, so the people of Damascus elected him in 1943 as their representative on the list of President Shukri al-Quwatli for four years. Preferring journalistic work over parliamentary work, calling on governments to strengthen the economy, support agriculture and industry, and increase production.

Publications
The book “Nidal” is the first book that was published by Najib Al-Rayyes in 1934 in the Al-Qabas Press in Damascus. It collected a number of his articles that dealt with important events in that period, and the book has now been republished without any modification, as it continued as it appeared in its first edition. He described this book, which is located on 366 medium pages, as a model for the "hot and special style of Najib Al-Rayyes" that he practiced in his newspaper "Al-Qabas" and as evidence of his national political positions in defense of Syria's independence and unity. As for the second book of Najib Al-Rayyes, "Jarrah", it was published a few months after his death in 1952 and was reprinted after nearly fifty-six years without any modification or revision. The articles in this 220-page medium-sized book narrate the events of Syria between 1935 and 1945, "when Syrian political life was tumultuous and full of revolutions and struggles against colonialism and demands for the country's unity and independence." As for the book “Al-Qabas Al-Ma’di’,” the tenth book in the series “Al-Amal Al-Mukhtara,” published by Dar Al-Rayyis in 1994, it is “a book on Najib Al-Rayyes and written by it.” The book, which included 470 large pages, includes some of what was published about Najib al-Rayes during his life and after his death, in addition to what he wrote of miscellaneous items "in the Lebanese press in particular, which sheds new lights on his life and positions." And the publishing house continued, "It has been added to this book, in its new edition, some articles and pictures that were absent from the original edition."

Death
Al-Rayyes continued his work in the press until he felt some tiredness, so he went to the Syrian Hammam Baths to recover and stayed there for ten days.

References

Syrian political journalists
Arab political writers
1898 births
1952 deaths
People from Hama